Corticivora is a genus of moths belonging to the subfamily Olethreutinae of the family Tortricidae.

Species
Corticivora chica Brown, 1984
Corticivora clarki Clarke, 1951
Corticivora parva Brown, 1984
Corticivora piniana (Herrich-Schäffer, 1851)

See also
List of Tortricidae genera

References

External links
tortricidae.com

Grapholitini
Tortricidae genera